Beatriz Manrique Guevara (born 20 May 1967) is a Mexican politician from the Ecologist Green Party of Mexico. From 2008 to 2009 she served as Deputy of the LX Legislature of the Mexican Congress representing Guanajuato.

References

1967 births
Living people
Women members of the Chamber of Deputies (Mexico)
Ecologist Green Party of Mexico politicians
21st-century Mexican politicians
21st-century Mexican women politicians
People from León, Guanajuato
Politicians from Guanajuato
Members of the Congress of Guanajuato
Deputies of the LX Legislature of Mexico
Members of the Chamber of Deputies (Mexico) for Guanajuato